Ho Man Hou (() is a Macanese footballer who plays as a striker for Tim Iec and the Macau national football team.

International goals

References 

Living people
1988 births
Macau footballers
Macau international footballers
G.D. Lam Pak players
Association football forwards
Windsor Arch Ka I players
Sporting Clube de Macau players
Liga de Elite players